Bonheur may refer to:

People
Auguste Bonheur, French painter
Isidore Bonheur, French animalier sculptor
Juliette Bonheur, French painter
Lucien Bonheur, French Progressive
Rosa Bonheur, French artist

Other
Bonheur (company), Norwegian company

See also
 Le Bonheur (disambiguation)

Surnames of French origin